Louisa "Blue Lu" Barker (née Louise Dupont) (November 13, 1913 – May 7, 1998) was an American jazz and blues singer. Her better-known recordings include "Don't You Feel My Leg" (1938), which she wrote with her husband, "Georgia Grind" and "Look What Baby's Got for You."

She was born in New Orleans, Louisiana, and often sang and performed with her husband, guitarist Danny Barker, a regular of the New Orleans music scene.

Barker's recording of "A Little Bird Told Me" was released by Capitol Records as catalogue number 15308 in 1948. It first reached the Billboard chart on December 18, 1948, and lasted 14 weeks on the chart, peaking at number 4.

Barker was inducted into the Louisiana Blues Hall of Fame in 1997, one year before she died in New Orleans, at the age of 84.

See also
List of classic female blues singers
List of people from New Orleans, Louisiana

References

Classic female blues singers
Jazz musicians from New Orleans
American jazz singers
American women jazz singers
American blues singers
1913 births
1998 deaths
20th-century American singers
Singers from Louisiana
20th-century American women singers
Decca Records artists
Capitol Records artists